Julia Kathleen Murney (born January 14, 1969) is an American actress and singer, also known for television commercial voice-overs. Until 2005, she was commonly known as the Broadway actress who had technically never appeared on Broadway. This was because her fame came mostly from her performances on the Broadway charity circuit, and not traditional Broadway productions. She played the role of Elphaba in the musical Wicked, both on the US national tour (2006) and on Broadway (2007). She is also a two-time Drama Desk Award nominee, for The Wild Party (2000) and Falling (2013).

Early life
The daughter of actor Christopher Murney and Anne Murney, Murney was named after the song "Julia" from The Beatles White Album. She has a younger sister, Caitlin (born 1977), who is a film producer and lives in LA and younger brother, Patrick (born 1987), who is an actor and graduated from Syracuse University with a drama degree in 2009.

Murney attended the High School of Music & Art (later Fiorello H. LaGuardia High School) as a voice major and graduated from Syracuse University in 1990.

Career
In the liner notes from Murney's album I'm Not Waiting, composer Andrew Lippa says that he first met her in June 1996. He said,  I was the music director for a Stephen Schwartz compendium called Snapshots, auditions were going well, if uninspiring, until a certain Julia Murney (with whom I was, at the time, unacquainted) strutted into the room. She sang a song, a forever favorite ever since, called Imagine My Surprise. Heartbreaking. Seeing as I was about to do the reading of The Wild Party in August, I wrote on my notes "Is she Queenie?!?!?" followed by several stars and excited doodles. Then, the director asked for another song, preferably something by Stephen Schwartz. la Murney: I know Meadowlark  la director: That'd be great  I didn't bring the music  la pianist: (panic) la Lippa: (heroically) I know it, what key? (oh, the swagger, the cock-suredness. I did want to impress her, after all)

Murney's Off-Broadway theatrical credits include originating the role of 'Queenie' in Andrew Lippa's The Wild Party (2000) at the Manhattan Theatre Club, opposite Brian d'Arcy James, Idina Menzel, and Taye Diggs, for which she was nominated for the Drama Desk Award for Outstanding Actress in a Musical. She was also seen in The Vagina Monologues, Crimes of the Heart (2001), A Class Act (2000), Time and Again (2001), and First Lady Suite. She appeared in a musical version of the film Saved! at the Playwrights Horizons Theatre, which began previews on May 9 and opened on June 3, 2008. In August 2008, Murney played the title role in Andrew Lloyd Webber's Evita at the Wells Fargo Pavilion in Sacramento.

Murney made her debut on Broadway in 2005, in the short-lived musical Lennon. She was also seen in the Actors' Fund benefit concerts of Funny Girl, Chess, Hair, and the World AIDS Day Benefit Concert Pippin. She has also been featured on television in Sex and the City, Ed, NYPD Blue, and various episodes of Law & Order.

Afterwards, Murney succeeded Stephanie J. Block in the lead role of Elphaba in the first national touring company of the musical Wicked on March 6, 2006. In that role, she won an Acclaim Award from the Cincinnati Enquirer for leading performer in a musical. She departed the tour on September 3, 2006, after six months, and was replaced by Shoshana Bean. Murney then transferred to the Broadway production, reprising the role of Elphaba for a nine-month engagement, beginning January 9, 2007, replacing Ana Gasteyer. She played her final performance on October 7, 2007 and was replaced by Stephanie J. Block. Both on tour and on Broadway, she starred opposite Kendra Kassebaum as Glinda.

Her debut solo album, I'm Not Waiting, was released in May 2006 on the Sh-K-Boom Records label. The album's title song was written specially for Murney by Andrew Lippa, with whom she has a strong artistic relationship. Also on the album are a jazz acoustic version of the song "I'm Not That Girl" from Wicked and "Perfect", which was written with Tom Kitt. Murney can be heard on the original cast albums of The Wild Party and A Class Act as well as the Actors' Fund recordings of Hair and Chess.

Murney played Mrs. Walker in The Who's Tommy in Oklahoma City from February 5–21, 2009. In September 2009, she appeared in the Signature Theatre's production of First You Dream - The Songs of Kander and Ebb in Arlington, Virginia, with Norm Lewis, Matthew Scott, Heidi Blickenstaff, Eleasha Gamble, and James Clow.

Her other Off-Broadway credits include Queen of the Mist and Closer Than Ever.

In 2013, Murney received a nomination for the Drama Desk Award for Outstanding Actress in a Play for her role as Tami in the play Falling. She played Princess Fiona in The Muny's production of Shrek the Musical from June 24–30, 2013. She returned to The Muny in 2014 to play Mayzie LaBird in Seussical  and in 2016 to play Donna Sheridan in Mamma Mia!. Murney played Rose in the 2017 Cape Playhouse production of Gypsy.

In May 2013 Murney sang with the Omaha Symphony in the concert "The Wizard and I - The Musical Journey of Stephen Schwartz" at the Holland Performing Arts Center in Omaha, Nebraska. The concert featured songs from Godspell and Wicked and the song "Meadowlark".

In 2021, Murney played the role of Arlene in Out of the Box Theatrical's immersive off-Broadway revival of the musical "Baby". In 2022 Murney appeared in the off-broadway production of "Between the Lines" in the role of Grace/Queen Maureen. Both productions released cast albums in 2023 which Murney appeared on.

Filmography

Film

Television

Video games

References

External links
 
 
 
  (archive)
  (archive)
 Behind the Scenes: Getting Green with Wicked Leading Lady Julia Murney
 Credits Broadwayworld.com

1969 births
Living people
American women singers
American film actresses
American musical theatre actresses
American stage actresses
American television actresses
American video game actresses
American voice actresses
People from State College, Pennsylvania
The High School of Music & Art alumni
Syracuse University alumni
20th-century American actresses
21st-century American actresses